K. Sreekumar, known as Asha Menon is a writer and reviewer of Malayalam literature.

Personal life
Asha Menon was born on 18 November 1947 at Kollengode, Palakkad district, Kerala, India. He graduated with a Bachelor's Degree. He left his engineering studies midway to join the South Indian Bank as an officer. After some years, he took voluntary retirement from the service.

Works
Asha Menon is a study of a calm search for nature and man, and a study of genetics, music, science and spirituality.
 Puthiya Purusharthangal (1978)
 Kaliyugaranyakangal (1982)
 Parivrajakante Mozhi (1984)
 Prathirodhangal (1985)
 Herbarium (1985)
 Thanumanasi (1990)
 Jeevante Kaiyoppu (1992)
 Adarunna Kakkakal (Travelogue-1994)
 Paragakosangal (1997)
 Payasvini (1999)
 Krishnasilayum Himasirassum (2001)
 Khalsayude Jalasmrithi (2003)
 Sraddhaswarangal (2006)
 Osho Vinte Neela Njarambu (2007)
 Himalaya Prathyakshangal (2007)
 Elamulachikal (2007, 2010)
 Himachalinte Nissanthwanangal (2010)
 Prathirodhangal (2010)
 Katha Dasakam (2012) 
 Utharendian Greeshmathiloode (2015)

Awards
 Kerala Sahitya Akademi Award for 'Thanumanasi' in 1990. 
 Kerala Sahitya Akademi Award for 'Jeevante Kaiyoppu' in 1994.

See also
 Kerala Sahitya Akademi Award for Travelogue to Adarunna Kakkakal in 1995

References

External links
 Official website
 Kerala Sahitya Akademi Awards
 DC Books 

Novelists from Kerala
20th-century Indian novelists
Indian male novelists
Indian male short story writers
20th-century Indian short story writers
20th-century Indian male writers
1947 births
Living people